Jerktown or Jerk town may refer to:

 Water stop on railroad line
 "Jerk Town", a 1965 single by The Knickerbockers